Thomas or Tom Whittaker may refer to:

Thomas Bartlett Whitaker (born 1979), American criminal, former Texas Death Row inmate
Thomas Whittaker (martyr) (1614–1646), English Roman Catholic priest
Thomas Whittaker (metaphysician) (1856–1935), English metaphysician and critic
Thomas Sherren Whittaker (1868–1914), British Isles rugby union footballer
Thomas Whittaker (politician) (1850–1919), British politician
Tom Whittaker (footballer) (1898–1956), football player and manager of Arsenal F.C.
Tom Whittaker (mountaineer) (born 1948), disabled mountaineer, the first disabled person to climb Mount Everest
Tom Whittaker (rugby union) (born 1986), English rugby union footballer
Tom Whittaker (trade unionist) (died 1995), English trade union leader
Thomas W. Whitaker (1904–1993), American botanist and horticulturist
T. K. Whitaker (1916–2017), Irish economist and public servant
Thomas Dunham Whitaker (1759–1821), English clergyman and topographer
Thomas Whittaker (rugby league), rugby league footballer who played in the 1900s and 1910s